Speed skating at the 2002 Winter Olympics was held over fourteen days, from 9 to 23 February. Ten events were contested at the Utah Olympic Oval.

Medal summary

Medal table

Men's events

Women's events

Records

Salt Lake City's high altitude was a major contributing factor to the speed of the Utah Olympic Oval's ice, as new Olympic records were set in all ten events, and new World records in eight.

Participating NOCs
Twenty-three nations competed in the speed skating events at Salt Lake City.

References

External links
 
 
Official Results Book – Speed skating

 
2002 Winter Olympics events
2002
Olympics, 2002